Krasny Yar (Qyzyljar) is a rural locality (a selo) and the administrative center of Krasnoyarsky District of Astrakhan Oblast, Russia. Population:

References

Notes

Sources

Rural localities in Krasnoyarsky District, Astrakhan Oblast